Karunakaran Babu is an Indian judge who is presently serving as a judge of Kerala High Court. The High Court of Kerala is the highest court in the Indian state of Kerala and in the Union Territory of Lakshadweep. The High Court of Kerala is headquartered at Ernakulam, Kochi. He was serving as the Principal District and Sessions Judge, Thiruvananthapuram before being elevated as the judge of Kerala High Court.

Early life and education
Babu had attended Government High School, Thevannoor, mastered in Economics from University of Kerala, obtained law degree from Government Law College, Thiruvananthapuram and LLM Degree from the Mahatma Gandhi University, Kottayam.

Career
Babu enrolled as an advocate on 20.03.1994 started practicing at Kottarakara and Kollam. During his practice mainly concentrated in civil law along with various branches of laws were handled. He joined Kerala Judicial Service as District & Sessions Judge in 2009 and Served as Additional District Judge at Thalassery, Pathanamthitta and Kottayam. Special Judge (SPE/CBI) at Ernakulam, Special Commissioner, Sabarimala, Registrar (Subordinate Judiciary), Registrar (Officer on Special Duty) in the Supreme Court of India, Principal District Judge, Thiruvananthapuram and as Chairman of the Supreme Court appointed Committee of the Sree Padmanabha Swami Temple, while serving as Principal District Judge, Thiruvananthapuram. Elevated as Additional Judge of the High Court on 25.2.2021 and became permeant judge from 06.06.2022.

References

External links
 High Court of Kerala

Living people
1964 births
Judges of the Kerala High Court
20th-century Indian judges